Elasmodactylus is a small genus of geckos from Africa. It currently has two species.

Species
The two species are:
Elasmodactylus tetensis — (Zambezi thick-toed gecko) 
Elasmodactylus tuberculosus — (warty thick-toed gecko)

References

 
Lizard genera